Jacques Coene (active late 1380s – 1411) was a Flemish painter, illustrator, and architect. He worked in Belgium, France, and Italy. In 1399, he worked in the building of Milan Cathedral. He apparently had commissions from John, Duke of Berry and Philip the Bold.

Art historians sometimes attribute the Book of Hours created by the Boucicaut Master to him, however, this is no longer considered correct based on historical evidence.

Bibliography

References

14th-century births
Early Netherlandish painters
Manuscript illuminators
Artists from Bruges
1411 deaths